The Cubuy River is a river of Puerto Rico located in El Yunque National Forest.

See also
 List of rivers of Puerto Rico

References

External links
 USGS Hydrologic Unit Map – Caribbean Region (1974)
 Ríos de Puerto Rico 

Rivers of Puerto Rico